Melphina malthina, the white-patch forest swift, is a butterfly in the family Hesperiidae. It is found in Sierra Leone, Liberia, Ivory Coast, Ghana, Nigeria, Cameroon, the Republic of the Congo and the Democratic Republic of the Congo. The habitat consists of primary rainforests.

References

Butterflies described in 1876
Erionotini
Butterflies of Africa
Taxa named by William Chapman Hewitson